Devereaux St Bruno Ferris (born October 24, 1994) is a New Zealand-born, American rugby union player who plays at scrum-half for the NOLA Gold in Major League Rugby (MLR). He also represents America as a member of the United States men's national team. 

Ferris has also played for the San Francisco Rush in PRO Rugby, the USA Selects, the USA Islanders, and Life West.

Early life
Ferris was born on October 24, 1994 in Auckland, New Zealand and is of Māori descent. Ferris began playing rugby at the age of three and attended King's College. After having played rugby with Mid Northern RFC in New Zealand and with the San Diego Old Aztecs of San Diego, California for one season, Ferris moved to the United States permanently to play for Life West, where he has been coached by his father. In 2016, Ferris won a DII National Championship as a member of the Life West rugby team.

Club career

San Francisco Rush
In April 2016, it was announced that Ferris had signed with the San Francisco Rush of PRO Rugby for that competition's first and only season. Ferris made his debut for the Rush on April 17, appearing as a substitute, in a 37–25 loss to Sacramento. Ferris made his first start for the Rush at scrum-half on April 24, in a 35–18 defeat to Denver. Ferris scored two tries in one match on two occasions during the season: on July 16 against the San Diego Breakers and on July 30 against the Sacramento Express.

San Diego Legion
Ferris was listed on the roster for the San Diego Legion for their inaugural season in Major League Rugby, but he did not make an appearance for the club.

Seattle Seawolves
Ferris signed with Seattle for the 2021 MLR season.

NOLA Gold
Ferris signed with NOLA Gold for the 2022 MLR season.

International career

USA Islanders
In 2017, it was announced that Ferris had been named to the roster of the USA Islanders and would serve as vice-captain. On August 10, 2017, Ferris started for the Islanders at scrum-half in their inaugural match—a 92–0 defeat to Saracens F.C.

USA Selects
Ferris was first named to the USA Selects' roster in September 2017, as a non-travelling reserve, in advance of the 2017 Americas Pacific Challenge. In September 2018, it was announced that Ferris had been named to the Selects' roster for the 2018 Americas Pacific Challenge. Ferris made his debut for the Selects on October 6, 2018, appearing as a substitute, in a 39–30 defeat to Tonga.

USA Eagles
Ferris was first named to the roster for the USA Eagles for the 2018 Americas Rugby Championship, but he did not make an appearing during the competition. Ferris made his debut for the Eagles on November 10, 2018, appearing as a substitute, in the Eagles' 30–29 victory over Samoa during the 2018 end-of-year tests.

References

1994 births
Living people
New Zealand rugby union players
United States international rugby union players
Rugby union scrum-halves
Life Chiropractic College West alumni
American rugby union players
San Francisco Rush players
San Diego Legion players
Seattle Seawolves players
New Orleans Gold players
Rugby union players from Auckland